Trinity College Chapel may refer to:

 Trinity College Chapel, Cambridge of Trinity College, Cambridge
 Trinity College Chapel, Hartford, at Trinity College, Connecticut
 Trinity College Chapel, Dublin of Trinity College, Dublin
 Trinity College Chapel, Kandy, in Kandy, Ceylon
 Trinity College Chapel, Oxford of Trinity College, Oxford
 Trinity College Chapel, at University of Trinity College, Toronto